Mayor of Lincoln may refer to:

 Mayor of Lincoln, England
Mayor of Lincoln, Nebraska